Thủ Đức is a municipal city (sub-city) under the administration of Ho Chi Minh City, Vietnam.
 
The city was founded by the Standing Committee of the National Assembly on December 9, 2020 from the districts of 2, 9, and Thủ Đức District. Thu Duc City covers 211.56 km², the population as of 2019 was 1,013,795 inhabitants. With the establishment of Thu Duc City, the main city will contribute more to the national economic growth and boost the development in Southern Key Economic Zone (SKEZ).

This new city-within-city model has been used by many places in the world including financial center Canary Wharf in London, Silicon Valley in the United States, Gangnam in Seoul or Pudong in Shanghai, etc. It was suggested that Thu Duc should be given autonomy in decision making and policy incentives to develop innovation capacity to improve competitiveness like what China did to Shenzhen, whose economy now is larger than Hong Kong's.

Administration
Thu Duc is a class-1 city of Ho Chi Minh City and the first city to use city-within-city model in Vietnam.

Thủ Đức City has 34 wards: An Khánh, An Lợi Đông, An Phú, Bình Chiểu, Bình Thọ, Bình Trưng Đông, Bình Trưng Tây, Cát Lái, Hiệp Bình Chánh, Hiệp Bình Phước, Hiệp Phú, Linh Chiểu, Linh Đông, Linh Tây, Linh Trung, Linh Xuân, Long Bình, Long Phước, Long Thạnh Mỹ, Long Trường, Phú Hữu, Phước Bình, Phước Long A, Phước Long B, Tam Bình, Tam Phú, Tân Phú, Tăng Nhơn Phú A, Tăng Nhơn Phú B, Thạnh Mỹ Lợi, Thảo Điền, Thủ Thiêm, Trường Thạnh, Trường Thọ.

After arrangement, Ho Chi Minh City consists of 22 district-level subdivisions including 1 city, 16 urban districts, and 5 rural districts. The further commune-level subdivisions would have 312 in total including 249 wards, 58 communes, 5 commune-level towns.

Innovation Centers
There are eight innovation centers in total of Thu Duc city:
 Thu Thiem Fintech Hub
 Truong Tho Port Urban Area
 Rach Chiec Sports and Wellness Hub
 National University IT and EduTech Hub
 Saigon Hi-Tech Park and Automated Manufacturing Hub
 Tam Da Ecotech Hub
 Creative Startup Center
 Traffic Hub connecting the Southeastern parts and Cat Lai International Port

Economy
Thu Duc City will contribute one third of Ho Chi Minh City's gross regional domestic product (GRDP) and account for 7 percent of the national gross domestic product (GDP), which is only behind Hanoi's GRDP in scale but higher than that of Binh Duong and Dong Nai.

Infrastructure

Highway and Expressway
 Hà Nội Highway
 Ho Chi Minh City–Long Thanh–Dau Giay Expressway
 Ring Road 2
 Ring Road 3

Services
 New Eastern Bus Station
 Ho Chi Minh City Metro

Facilities 
During the existence of South Vietnam, it was the location of Thu Duc Military Academy.

References

External links
Resolution No.1111/NQ-UBTVQH14 on establishment of Thu Duc City under Ho Chi Minh City (in Vietnamese) by 14th Standing Committee of the National Assembly.

Districts of Ho Chi Minh City
Cities in Vietnam